Yasir Hussain is a Pakistani screenwriter, actor, playwright and host from Islamabad best known for his comic roles. He hosted The After Moon Show on Hum TV. He is also known for playing the antagonist in the 2018 social drama Baandi.

Life and career 
Born into a Rajput family from Azad Kashmir, he's the youngest in a family of twelve siblings, including a sister who's a Dubai-based singer, Schumaila Hussain, and who has more recently gained attention for singing the OSTs of dramas Muqabil and Khamoshi, while she has also done works for Lollywood and Bollywood, and a brother who's a scriptwriter.

Hussain remain associated with Kopycats Production as they produced some of the great plays for theatre which were written by Anwar Maqsood like Half Plate, Pawney 14 August, Sawa 14 August and Saichin and the most popular Aangan Terha in which Yasir Hussain played the role of Akbar which was originally played by late Saleem Nasir.

Hussain made his Lollywood debut as Moti in the film Karachi Se Lahore (2015) written by himself and directed by Wajahat Rauf.

He has also acted in television serials including sitcom Coke Kahani Kya Life Hai and drama serial Dareecha. He reprised his role as Moti in Lahore Se Aagey (2016) was a spin-off to Karachi Se Lahore and was released on 11 November 2016. He appeared in multiple telefilms and a drama serial Shaadi Mubarak Ho opposite to Kubra Khan directed by Wajahat Rauf and written by Yasir Hussain himself. Hussain hosted two seasons of The After Moon Show. He is currently playing role of an antagonist in drama serial Baandi named as Tahawar.

Yasir Hussain made his comeback in theater after 7 years with Naach Na Jaanay a prequel to Aangan Terrha. The play has been written by Anwar Maqsood. It has been unveiled that the play will be put on premier on 23 March 2019. Yasir will be leading into the main role of the theater play as the Akbar in the play. Years back this Angan tehra play broke so many records with the highlight of 101 consecutive shows in Karachi. It was also written by Anwar Maqsood. In Aangan Tehra, Yasir played the role of Saleem Nasir sahib's character from his drama Aangan Terha as to be seven years back in the serial's theatre adaptation. Dawar Mahmood will be directing it and KopyKats is standing as producing it at Arts Council Karachi. Yasir said that his role is all about the dancer who is living into the era of Zia.

Yasir Hussain has received criticism from Pathan community for mocking their language  Pashto  and often trying to elicit racist responses from audiences toward Pathan jokes.

Yasir Hussain was also criticized for his unwelcoming attitude towards Turkish actors and actresses when they came to act in Pakistani ads. He got trolled on every post for his fights but some celebrities agreed he was being bullied and the trolling was getting too much.

Personal life 
Yasir Hussain publicly proposed to TV actress Iqra Aziz at the Lux Style Awards. They were married in Karachi on 28 December 2019.

Filmography

Film

Television

Theatre

Accolades

Telefilm

References

External links 
 
 

 
Pakistani dramatists and playwrights
VJ (video performance artists)
Writers from Islamabad
People from Azad Kashmir
Living people
Pakistani male film actors
Pakistani male television actors
Male actors in Urdu cinema
Punjabi people
Year of birth missing (living people)